IBM Software Configuration and Library Manager (SCLM) is an IBM software product that is a component of ISPF.  

It was first introduced with Version 3 of ISPF and was an upgrade to a previous component called LMF (Library Management Facility) that was introduced in version 2 of ISPF.   It is a component of MVS, OS/390 and z/OS operating systems/platforms. The SCLM consists of two products: a library manager and a configuration manager and provides the following functions:

 Manages changes to application data
 Performs auditing and versioning
 Controls the movement of application data from one set of staging libraries to the next (known as Promote in SCLM)
 Tracks application components
 Provides an intelligent build function
 Provides secure promote
 Integrates with both Tivoli Information Management for z/OS and WebSphere Studio Asset Analyzer for z/OS

Notes

SCLM
Proprietary version control systems